This article lists a selection of notable works created by Auguste Rodin. The listing follows the books Rodin, Vie et Oeuvre and Rodin.

Sculptures

Museums
Albertinum, Dresden
Art Gallery of Western Australia, Perth
Art Institute of Chicago
Brooklyn Museum, New York City
Calouste Gulbenkian Museum, Lisbon
Cantor Arts Center, Stanford
Cleveland Museum of Art
Dallas Museum of Art
Fin-de-Siècle Museum, Brussels
Fondation Bemberg, Toulouse
Jardin des Serres d'Auteuil, Paris
Kunsthaus Zürich
Legion of Honor (museum), San Francisco
Los Angeles County Museum of Art
Maryhill Museum of Art, State of Washington
Metropolitan Museum of Art, New York City
Musée d'arts de Nantes
Musée d'Orsay, Paris
Musée de l'Orangerie, Paris
Musée des Beaux-Arts d'Angers
Musée des Beaux-Arts de Dijon
Musée du Luxembourg
Musée Fabre, Montpellier
Musée Rodin, Paris
Museo Nacional de Bellas Artes (Buenos Aires)
Museum of Fine Arts Bern
Museum of Fine Arts of Lyon
Museum of Fine Arts, Reims
National Gallery (Berlin)
National Gallery of Art, Washington
National Museum in Warsaw
National Museum of Art, Architecture and Design, Oslo
National Museum of Western Art, Tokyo
Ny Carlsberg Glyptotek, Copenhagen
Palais des Beaux-Arts de Lille
Petit Palais, Paris
Philadelphia Museum of Art
Pinacoteca do Estado de São Paulo
Portland Museum of Art
Royal Museum of Fine Arts Antwerp
São Paulo Museum of Art
Soumaya Museum, Mexico City
Tuileries Garden, Paris

Media
Bronze
Glass casting
Manufacture nationale de Sèvres
Marble
Plaster
Polychrome

See also
 Man with the Broken Nose (1863)
 Alsatian Orphan (1871)
 Suzon (1872–73)
 The Age of Bronze (1876)
 La Defense (1879)
 The Maiden Kissed by the Ghost (1880)
 The Shade (1880)
 The Gates of Hell (1880/1917)
 The Thinker (1880, locations)
 Adam (1880–81)
 Eve (1881)
 Crouching Woman (1880–1882)
 Saint John the Baptist (1880/1907)
 Ugolino and His Sons (1881)
 The Kiss (1882)
 I am beautiful (1882)
 The Falling Man (1882)
 Jules Dalou (1883)
 Bust of Maurice Haquette (1883)
 Bust of Victor Hugo (1883)
 Eternal Springtime (1884)
 Torso of Adele (c. 1884)
 The Burghers of Calais (1884–1889)
 Head of Camille Claudel (1884/1911)
 The Prodigal Son (1885)
 Mask of a Weeping Woman (1885)
 The Martyr (1885)
 Psyche Looking at Love (1885)
 Eustache de Saint Pierre (1885–86)
 Jean d'Aire (1885–86)
 Jean de Fiennes (1885–86)
 Avarice and Lust (1885–1887)
 Damned Women (1885–1890)
 The Old Tree (1885)
 Paolo and Francesca (1885)
 Young Mother (1885)
 Young Mother in the Grotto (1885)
 Young Woman with a Serpent (c. 1885)
 The Three Shades (1886)
 Meditation (1886) 
 Fugitive Love (1886–87)
 Ovid's Metamorphoses (1886–1889)
 Pierre de Wiessant (1887)
 Head of Saint John the Baptist (1887)
 The Sirens (1887)
 Polyphemus (1888)
 Standing Mercury (1888)
 The Kneeling Man (1888)
 Adonis Awakens (1889)
 Andromeda (1889)
 Glaucus (1889)
 Kneeling Female Faun (1889)
 The Succubus (1889) 
 Despair (c. 1890)
 Brother and Sister (1890)
 Danaid (1890)
 Cybele (1890/1904)
 Monument to Balzac (1892–1897)
 Balzac in the Robe of a Dominican Monk (1892)
 Youth Triumphant (c. 1894)
 Octave Mirdeau (1895)
 Iris, Messenger of the Gods (c.1895)
 Bacchantes Embracing (c. 1896)
 The Spirit of Eternal Repose (1898–99)
 Illusions Received by the Earth (pre-1900)
 The Athlete (1901–1904)
 The Death of Adonis (1903–1906)
 Adam and Eve (1905)
 The Walking Man (1907)
 The Cathedral (1908)
 The Prayer (1909) 
 Standing Female Faun (1910)

Notes

References

External links
 
 
 Auguste Rodin in Google Arts & Culture